Joel Nascimento (Rio de Janeiro, October 13, 1937) is a musician, mandolin, multi-instrumentalist Brazilian. He toured with John McLaughin, Paco de Lucia, Raphael Rabello and Arthur Moreira Lima. He was labeled by historian Paul Sparks "perhaps the leading player of the present day" for his skill as a performance mandolinist.

References

Brazilian mandolinists
Brazilian multi-instrumentalists
1937 births
Living people